Drax is a surname, and may refer to:

 Henry Drax (c. 1693–1755), English politician
 James Drax (died 1662), Barbados plantation owner 
 Reginald Drax (1880–1967), British admiral
 Richard Drax (born 1958), British politician
 Hugo Drax, fictional character in the James Bond novel Moonraker